Laithes is a hamlet in the civil parish of Skelton, in the English county of Cumbria. It belongs to Eden District. Laithes's region is North West. Height is 170.6m.

See also

Listed buildings in Skelton, Cumbria
Philip's Street Atlas (page 70)

References 

Hamlets in Cumbria
Skelton, Cumbria